Glucosyl-3-phosphoglycerate synthase (GpgS protein, GPG synthase, glucosylphosphoglycerate synthase) is an enzyme with systematic name NDP-glucose:3-phospho-D-glycerate 2-alpha-D-glucosyltransferase. This enzyme catalyses the following chemical reaction

 NDP-glucose + 3-phospho-D-glycerate  NDP + 2-O-(alpha-D-glucopyranosyl)-3-phospho-D-glycerate

The enzyme is involved in biosynthesis of 2-O-(alpha-D-glucopyranosyl)-D-glycerate.

References

External links 

EC 2.4.1